Marc Willers (born 11 September 1985) is a New Zealand racing cyclist who represents New Zealand in BMX. He was selected to represent New Zealand at the 2008 and the 2012 Summer Olympics in the men's BMX event, reaching the semi-final in 2012.

References

External links
 
 
 
 

1985 births
Living people
BMX riders
New Zealand male cyclists
Olympic cyclists of New Zealand
Cyclists at the 2008 Summer Olympics
Cyclists at the 2012 Summer Olympics
Sportspeople from Cambridge, New Zealand
21st-century New Zealand people